The Renault/Nissan C is an automobile platform for front wheel drive automobiles. Production Nissans on this platform began to surface in 2004, with the Japanese-market 7-seater Lafesta. 

The first generation Nissan Tiida/Tiida Latio, whose size falls in the C-segment, instead uses a stretched Nissan B platform.

Vehicles

Renault
 2002 Renault Mégane Mk.II
 2003 Renault Scénic Mk.II
 2006 Renault Koleos
 2008 Renault Mégane Mk.III
 2007 Renault Kangoo Mk.II 
 2012 Mercedes-Benz Citan
 2009 Renault Scénic Mk.III
 2009 Renault Fluence

Nissan
 2004 Nissan Lafesta B30
 2005 Nissan Serena/Suzuki Landy C25
 2006 Nissan Qashqai J10
 2007 Nissan Sentra B16
 2007 Nissan X-Trail T31
 2008 Nissan Rogue S35

Venucia
 2014 Venucia T70
 2015 Venucia T70X
 2016 Venucia T90

Renault Samsung
 2008 Renault Samsung QM5
 2009 Renault Samsung New SM3

C
C

External links
 provide official information about C platform development.